George Knightley is a principal character depicted by Jane Austen in her novel Emma, published in 1815. He is a landowner and gentleman farmer, though "having little spare money".  A lifetime friend of Emma's, though nearly seventeen years older than she, he enjoys correcting her.

Character
A kind and compassionate person, Mr. Knightley exhibits good judgement, high moral character and maturity in contrast to Emma's still-maturing character: as a hero, he also has presence and authority, and a natural lifelike quality. The most hard-working of Austen's heroes, he is also the least grand and ostentatious, not even keeping a pair of carriage horses. As the owner of the largest estate in the area (Donwell Abbey) this makes his down to earth manners all the more remarkable.  Despite a certain sharpness of tongue, his genuine qualities are revealed for example by his disappointment when he sees Emma insult Miss Bates, a spinster of modest means. Mr. Knightley's reprimand of Emma for this insult also demonstrates his affection and esteem for her as a friend. Another revealing incident is his anger with Emma for persuading Harriet Smith to refuse Robert Martin's proposal of marriage, Martin being in Knightley's eyes an eminently suitable husband for Harriet: the row that follows leaves the pair estranged for a time. But while in some respects serving as a conduct book mentor for Emma, Knightley learns from his own desire for Emma and his jealousy-fuelled blunders - which brings the characters into a more realistic, egalitarian relationship, just as in their marriage her money will complement his role as the leading local landowner.

Role in narrative

In the course of the story, Emma believes that she falls briefly in love with a young, handsome man named Frank Churchill.  Mr. Knightley's jealousy of the latter is gradually uncovered: he makes several negative remarks about Churchill, and is concerned that Frank has had a negative influence on Emma, but later admits that, because of jealousy, "I was not quite impartial in my judgement...My Emma". Frank Churchill's guardian—his aunt—dies, and he is now free to publicise his engagement to Jane Fairfax, which had been kept secret to avoid his domineering aunt's disapproval. Emma is shocked, but realises she had never really had romantic sentiments towards Frank Churchill. Nevertheless, she worries that Harriet has feelings for Frank, but soon discovers that Harriet has become infatuated with Mr. Knightley.

Emma becomes very unhappy; finally it dawns on her that she loves Mr. Knightley—and has for a time, apparently unconsciously—and is distressed as she believes Mr. Knightley and Harriet to be on the verge of marriage. Mr. Knightley is in London, visiting his brother John and sister-in-law Isabella (Emma's sister), when he is apprised of Churchill's clandestine engagement. He decided to return to Hartfield to offer support to Emma, whom he believes to be in love with Mr. Churchill. On the spur of the moment, after finding this to be untrue, he declares his love to Emma and asks her to marry him, and she accepts. Harriet and Robert Martin marry; Jane Fairfax and Frank Churchill plan a November wedding. Within a month, Emma and Mr. Knightley marry and, because Mr. Woodhouse cannot face life without his daughter, Mr. Knightley gallantly moves in with Emma and her father at the Woodhouse estate, Hartfield.

Notable portrayals
John Carson in the 1972 TV serial
Paul Rudd's character in the 1995 film Clueless, Josh Lucas, is based on George Knightley.
Jeremy Northam in the 1996 American film
Mark Strong in the 1996 British TV film
Jonny Lee Miller in the 2009 BBC TV serial
Abhay Deol in the 2010 Hindi adaptation, Aisha
Brent Bailey in the 2013 modernised adaptation, Emma Approved
Johnny Flynn in the 2020 film

References

Emma characters
Literary characters introduced in 1815
Fictional gentry